Heinrich Rienössl (4 June 1877 – 18 December 1939) was an Austrian writer. His work was part of the literature event in the art competition at the 1936 Summer Olympics.

References

1877 births
1939 deaths
20th-century Austrian male writers
Olympic competitors in art competitions
Writers from Vienna